The 2015 WAFF U-23 Championship took place in Doha, Qatar for the first time. Ten nations took part. The competition was held in Doha from 30 September 30 to 14 October with the draw for the tournament on 6 September 2015. Iran won the title after they defeated Syria in the final. This was Iran's last WAFF competition before joining the Central Asian Football Association.

The competition was used as a warm up for the 2016 AFC U-23 Championship which is also to be held in Qatar. This competition in turn is used as qualification for the Olympics football tournament of which these sides participating in the WAFF championship were eligible for.

Teams

Squads 

Each team had to register a squad of up to 23 players, three of whom must be goalkeepers.

Group stage

 All times listed are (UTC+3)

Group A

Group B

Group C

Ranking of second-placed teams
The best runner-up across all groups advance to semifinal. The results against the fourth-placed team are not counted when determining the ranking of the runner-up team.

Knockout stage

Semi-finals

Third place

Final

Champion

Final standing

Player awards 
 Best Player:  Amir Arsalan Motahari
 Top Scorer:  Akram Afif
 Best Goalkeeper:  Mohammadreza Akhbari

Goalscorers
4 goals

  Akram Afif

3 goals

  Amir Arsalan Motahari
  Ahmed Hisham
  Nasouh Al Nakdali
  Waleed Al-Hubaishi

2 goals

  Islam Batran
  Hamza Sanhaji
  Abdulla Madou
  Abdulmajeed Al-Sulayhem

1 goal

  Abdula Ali Hasan
  Ali Abdulrasool
  Hossein Fazeli
  Mehrdad Mohammadi
  Roozbeh Cheshmi
  Alireza Naghizadeh
  Mohammad Daneshgar
  Baha' Faisal
  Marwan Taaib
  Khalid Al Hamdani
  Jameel Saleem
  Ahmed Al Siyabi
  Almoez Ali
  Ahmed Alaaeldin
  Raed Al-Ghamdi
  Mahmoud Al Bahr
  Abdullah Al Shami
  Khaled Mobayed
  Khalifa Mubarak
  Ebraheim Khameis
  Saif Khalfan
  Ahmed Rabee
  Sultan Saif
  Ahmed Abdullah
  Abdulmuain Al-Jarshi

References

U23 2015
2015
2015 in Qatari sport
2015 in Asian football